Polyanovo is a village in Aytos Municipality, in Burgas Province, in southeastern Bulgaria.

Population
The village has 393 inhabitants. Most inhabitants are ethnic  Turks (95%).

References

Villages in Burgas Province